Kailash Narayan Sarang (died 14 November 2020) was an Indian politician who served as a member of the Rajya Sabha.

References

1930s births
2020 deaths
People from Bhopal
Rajya Sabha members from Madhya Pradesh
Bharatiya Janata Party politicians from Madhya Pradesh
Bharatiya Jana Sangh politicians